Silvestre Conti (born 9 December 1901, date of death unknown) was an Argentine footballer. He played in one match for the Argentina national football team in 1926. He was also part of Argentina's squad for the 1926 South American Championship.

References

External links
 

1901 births
Year of death missing
Argentine footballers
Argentina international footballers
Place of birth missing
Association football midfielders
Argentino de Rosario footballers